Kieran Roche (born 3 May 1979) is a rugby union footballer who plays at lock/back row for London Irish. He was educated at Trinity School in Croydon where he started playing rugby at the age of 12.

References

External links
London Irish profile
England profile

1979 births
Living people
Alumni of Loughborough University
London Irish players
Rugby union players from Portsmouth
Rugby union flankers